Ivo Caput (born 15 February 1993 in Dubrovnik) is a Croatian football forward, currently playing for NK GOŠK Dubrovnik 1919.

Club career
Born in Dubrovnik, Caput passed through the youth ranks of the local clubs HNK Dubrovnik 1919 and NK GOŠK Dubrovnik before debuting for the GOŠK senior team, aged 17. He subsequently became a permanent starter for his club, and his 13 goals in the 2012-2013 Treća HNL Jug season drew the attention of Hajduk Split. He was signed by Hajduk in August 2012, but sent back for the autumn period on a loan to his old club.

In June 2013 his contract with Hajduk was terminated

In September 2015 Caput moved from SVN Zweibrücken to NK Novigrad.

References

1993 births
Living people
Sportspeople from Dubrovnik
Association football forwards
Croatian footballers
NK GOŠK Dubrovnik players
HNK Hajduk Split players
SVN Zweibrücken players
NK Novigrad players
Croatian Football League players
Regionalliga players
First Football League (Croatia) players
Second Football League (Croatia) players
Croatian expatriate footballers
Expatriate footballers in Germany
Croatian expatriate sportspeople in Germany